Louise Amanda Dean (4 April 1971 – 18 June 1995) was a singer for the dance band Shiva.  She died in a hit and run accident. She is known for the house songs, "Work It Out" and "Freedom", the latter of which reached number 18 in the UK Singles Chart shortly after her death. The two founding members of the band were Gino Piscitelli and Paul Ross, who both hailed from Huddersfield, West Yorkshire. Piscitelli and Ross wrote the lyrics and music for Shiva, whilst Dean sang the songs. Franco Piscitelli was the unofficial fourth member of the band.

Single discography
"Work It Out" (1995) – UK #35
"Freedom" (1995) – UK #18

References

External links
Shiva
Shiva – Freedom
 Evil Rabbit

English house musicians
English electronic musicians
1971 births
1995 deaths
Pedestrian road incident deaths
Road incident deaths in England
Place of birth missing
Place of death missing
English women in electronic music
FFRR Records artists
20th-century English women singers
20th-century English singers